Franca–Ten. Lund Presotto State Airport  is the airport serving Franca, Brazil.
 
It is operated by Rede Voa.

History
On July 15, 2021 the concession of the airport was auctioned to Rede Voa, under the name Consórcio Voa NW e Voa SE. The airport was previously operated by DAESP.

Airlines and destinations
No scheduled flights operate at this airport.

Access

See also

List of airports in Brazil

References

External links

Airports in São Paulo (state)